Marine Vacth (born 9 April 1991) is a French actress and model. She lives in Paris with her boyfriend, photographer Paul Schmidt, and their son Henri, born in the spring of 2014.

Life and career
Vacth was born on 9 April 1991 in the 12th arrondissement of Paris. She grew up in the Paris suburb of Maisons-Alfort. Her father is a truck driver and her mother an accountant. Her surname is of Lorrain origin.

She was educated at the Lycée Eugène Delacroix in Maisons-Alfort. 

Vacth began her modeling career at the age of fifteen after she was scouted in H&M and started acting at twenty. She played "Tessa" in Cédric Klapisch's film My Piece of the Pie. In 2011, she succeeded Kate Moss as the face for Yves Saint Laurent perfumes and the Chloé brand.

She lives in Paris with her boyfriend, photographer Paul Schmidt, and their son Henri, born in the spring of 2014.

She is signed to Traffic Models.

She has worked with Leonardo DiCaprio for Oppo mobile  and appeared in a music video for DJ Cam's "Swim".

Filmography

References

External links

 Marine Vacth at the Fashion Model Directory
 

1991 births
Living people
French film actresses
French female models
Actresses from Paris
21st-century French actresses
French people of Lorrainian descent
Models from Paris